Vietnam Academy of Social Sciences (VASS) is a department of the Vietnamese government responsible for studying key social science issues in the Socialist Republic of Vietnam.

Leaders
Tran Huy Lieu: 1953-1959
Nguyen Khanh Toan: 1967-1982
Dao Van Tap: 1982-1985
Pham Nhu Cuong: 1985-1990
Dang Xuan Ky: 1990-1991
Nguyen Duy Quy: 1991-
Do Hoai Nam: 2003–2011
Nguyen Xuan Thang: 2011–2016
Nguyen Quang Thuan: 2016-2019
Bui Nhat Quang: 2019–present

Structure
 Institute of Anthropology
 Institute of Family and Gender Studies
 Institute of Archaeology
 Institute for Royal Citadel Studies - Viện NC Kinh thành
 Southern Institute of Sustainable Development
 Institute for Sustainable Development of the Central Region (Viện Khoa học xã hội vùng Trung Bộ)
 Institute for Sustainable Development of the Central Highland- Viện Khoa học xã hội vùng Tây Nguyên
 Institute of World Economics and Politics
 Vietnam Institute of Economics
 Institute of State and Law
 Institute for Human Studies
 Institute of European Studides
 Institute of African and Middle East Studies
 Vietnam Institute of American Studies
 Viện Nghiên cứu Đông Bắc Á
 Institute for Southeast Asian Studies
 Institute of Indian and Southwest Asian Studies
 Han-Nom Research Institute (Viện nghiên cứu Hán Nôm)
 Institute of Environment and Sustainable Development
 Institute for Religious Studies
 Institute for Chinese Studies
 Institute of Culture Studies
 Institute of Linguistics
 Institute of History
 Institute of Psychology
 Institute of Social Sciences Information
 Institute of Philosophy
 Viện Từ điển học và Bách khoa thư Việt Nam
 Institute of Literature
 Institute of Sociology
 Centre for Analysis and Forecasting
 Vietnam Museum of Ethnology
 Vietnam Social Science Review
 Social Sciences Publishing House
 Encyclopedia Publishing House
 Graduate Academy of Social Sciences
 Centre for Sustainable Development Policy Studies

References

External links
 Official site

Government of Vietnam
Research institutes in Vietnam